Lake Mercer may refer to:
 Grand Lake in Grand Lake St. Marys State Park, Mercer county
 Mercer Lake in Mercer County Park, New Jersey
 Mercer Lake (Antarctica), a subglacial lake in Antarctica